Singkil people are an ethnic group of people found in Aceh Singkil Regency and Subulussalam, Aceh province, Indonesia.

Their closest linguistic relations are the Pakpak people, but the customs and culture of the Singkil people are very different from the Pakpak people. This is because of the Singkil people practices Islam, whereas the majority of the Pakpak people practices Christianity. Apart from that the Singkil people have intermarried with the neighbouring ethnic group of people like Acehnese people and Minangkabau people.

Language 
Singkil language is widely spoken in Aceh Singkil Regency, Subulussalam and part of Southeast Aceh Regency. The Singkil language is very similar to Pakpak language of North Sumatra. However, the Singkil language have its own uniqueness whereby the alphabet "R" is pronounce as "kh". For example, the word "appearance" in Bahasa Indonesia is Rupa, while in Singkil language it is Khupa.

Culture 

The culture of the Singkil people itself has been greatly influenced by Islamic traditions. Although they may belong to the same clusters of parent-ethnic, the culture of the Pakpak people is vastly different from the Singkil people. This is because the Singkil people are mostly Muslims, while majority of the Pakpak people are Christians. Apart from that, mix marriages among the Singkil people with other foreign ethnics such as Acehnese people and Minangkabau people occurs more frequently.

Religion 
Islam is believed to have spread in lands of the Singkil people a few centuries ago by foreign merchants that came from Minangkabau Highlands and later during the rule of the Aceh Sultanate. Many of the Minangkabau people have left traces of their history and their descendants in the coastline region. Abdurrauf Singkil, also known as Syekh Abdur Rauf as-Singkili was once a famous Singkil ulama that was appointed as a head ulama and a mufti in the Acehnese kingdom in 17th century.

Surnames 

Just as with other sub-ethnic Batak people, the marga (family name or surname) of the Singkil people derives from the patrilineal lineage. Generally, the margas that are used by the Singkil people are similar to those used by the Pakpak people, Alas people, Kluet people and part of Karo people along with Toba people. Nevertheless, there are margas that are different. Several of the margas that are found among the Singkil people includes:-
 Kombih (Kumbi)
 Ramin
 Barat
 Palis (Pelis)
 Manik
 Kembang
 Kesugihen
 Lingga
 Bako
 Ujung
 Sulin (Solin)
 Pokan (Pohan)
There are also a number of Singkil margas that originates from the descendants of the Minangkabau people that have assimilated with the Singkil people centuries ago, such as:-
 Melayu (Malau)
 Goci

References

Further reading
 

Ethnic groups in Indonesia
Ethnic groups in Aceh